A by-election was held for the New South Wales Legislative Assembly electorate of Parramatta on 11 October 1856 because Henry Parker had been appointed Premier and Colonial Secretary, forming the Parker ministry.

Dates

Result

The by-election was caused by the appointment of Henry Parker as Premier and Colonial Secretary, forming the Parker ministry.

See also
Electoral results for the district of Parramatta
List of New South Wales state by-elections

References

1856 elections in Australia
New South Wales state by-elections
1850s in New South Wales